Skaay was a blind, crippled storyteller of the Haida village of Ttanuu born c. 1827 at Qquuna. Skaay could neither read nor write, but his stories of Haida mythology have survived in the form of written transcriptions taken down by John Swanton with the aide of Henry Moody over the winter of 1900. These transcriptions of myths are unique in the literature, both for their fidelity (due to Swanton) to the precise wordings of the mythteller, and for the survival of the pre-translation originals. 

The stories Skaay chose to dictate are the Qquuna Cycle, the longest poem recorded in Haida, Qquuna Qiighawaay, the oral history of Skaay's family, and Raven Travelling, Skaay's original take on the well-worn tale (see Raven Tales).

Skaay appears three times in church records: first, in 1884 when he was baptized "Robert McKay"; second, on 13 March 1892, again a baptism, where his name is entered simply as "Sky"; third, in January 1894 when he registers a marriage to "Esther" and was baptized once more, this time as "John Sky". In Haida, 'Skaay' refers to a type of mollusk. The Haida were divided into two social groups, or moieties, called Raven and Eagle. Skaay belonged to the Eagle side or moiety.

See also
Oral history

References
Bringhurst, Robert (2000) A Story As Sharp As a Knife: The Classical Haida Mythtellers and Their World. U of Nebraska Press; .
Being in Being : The Collected Works of a Master Haida Mythteller by Skaay of the Qquuna. (2002) Robert Bringhurst (Ed., Translator) University of Nebraska Press. 

1827 births
Year of death missing
19th-century First Nations people
Canadian storytellers
First Nations literature
Haida people
Mythography
19th-century storytellers